Zheng Dalun (Chinese: 郑达伦; Pinyin: Zhèng Dálún; born 11 February 1994) is a Chinese football player who currently plays for Chinese Super League side Shenzhen.

Club career
Zheng started his professional football career in 2011 when he was loaned to Shanghai Zobon's squad for the 2011 China League Two campaign. He joined Chinese Super League's newcomer Shanghai Dongya in 2013. On 21 May 2013, he made his debut for Shanghai Dongya in the third round of 2013 Chinese FA Cup which Shanghai Dongya played against Chongqing Lifan. Zheng missed his penalty in the first round of the penalty shootout, however, Shanghai eventually beat Chongqing 6–5 and advanced to the next round. On 27 September 2013, he made his Super League debut in a 6–1 home victory against Qingdao Jonoon, coming on as a substitute for Luis Cabezas in the 80th minute. He scored his first goal for Shanghai East Asia 5 minutes later in the match.

On 9 July 2015, Zheng was loaned to China League One side Tianjin Songjiang until 31 December 2015. He made a permanent transfer to Tianjin Quanjian on 11 February 2016 after Quanjian Nature Medicine took over the club.

Career statistics 
Statistics accurate as of match played 31 December 2020.

Honours

Club
Tianjin Quanjian F.C.
China League One: 2016

References

External links
 

1994 births
Living people
Chinese footballers
Sportspeople from Anshan
Footballers from Liaoning
Pudong Zobon players
Shanghai Port F.C. players
Tianjin Tianhai F.C. players
Shenzhen F.C. players
Chinese Super League players
China League One players
China League Two players
Association football forwards